Bristol Road railway station served the village of Worle, North Somerset, England, from 1912 to 1940 on the Weston, Clevedon and Portishead Railway.

History 
The station opened in July 1912 by the Weston, Clevedon and Portishead Railway. It had no shelter until 1938, when the station was repositioned on the other side of the crossing. It closed on 20 May 1940.

References

External links 

Disused railway stations in Somerset
Railway stations opened in 1912
Railway stations closed in 1940
1912 establishments in England
1940 disestablishments in England
Railway stations in Great Britain opened in the 20th century